Wawrzyniec is a Polish masculine given name. Notable people with the name include:

 Wawrzyniec Cyl (1900-1974), Polish footballer
 Wawrzyniec Grzymała Goślicki (circa 1530-1607), Polish nobleman
 Wawrzyniec Mitzler de Kolof (1711-1778), Polish physician
 Wawrzyniec Samp (born 1939), Polish sculptor
 Wawrzyniec Staliński (1899-1941), Polish footballer
 Wawrzyniec Styczeń (1836-1908), Polish social activist
 Wawrzyniec Żmurko (1824-1889), Polish mathematician
 Wawrzyniec Żuławski (1916-1957), Polish alpinist

Masculine given names
Polish masculine given names